Ağahüseyn Kazımov (1892-1937) joined the Council of People's Commissars of Azerbaijan as the People's Commissar's deputy for Health in Azerbaijan following the establishment of the Azerbaijan Soviet Socialist Republic on 28 April 1920.
5 june 1920 was appointed as Commissar for Health. Was replaced by Movsum Kadyrli on 28 November 1921.

References

1892 births
1937 deaths